Halosalda is a genus of true bugs belonging to the family Saldidae.

The species of this genus are found in Europe.

Species:
 Halosalda coracina Cobben, 1985
 Halosalda halophila (Jakovlev, 1876)

References

Saldidae